At Ease is an American sitcom starring Jimmie Walker that aired for 14 episodes on ABC from March 4 to June 10, 1983.

Synopsis
The series, which has a similar premise to another classic show, Sgt. Bilko, follows the misadventures of a pair of conniving GIs – Sgt. Val Valentine and PFC. Tony Baker – stationed at Camp Tar Creek, an Army base, dealing with computers and computer logistics, located somewhere in Texas. It is run by Colonel Clapp, who can be somewhat dense and credulous.

Valentine and Baker, along with the rest of their outfit, Company J., which includes privates Cardinal, Maurice and the klutzy and always hungry Maxwell, attempt to outwit the Colonel's by-the-book chief of security Major Hawkins and his informant Cpl. Wessel (who is very derisively called "Weasel" by Baker and Valentine, due to his propensity to snitch on Valentine and Baker to Hawkins), and profit from their hitch in the army.

Hawkins always tries to shut down Valentine n and Baker's schemes and shape the camp up to his high standards, but he usually ends up failing.

They are also assisted in their efforts by Baker's girlfriend, Cpl. Lola Grey, who serves as Clapp's secretary.

Cast
Roger Bowen - Col. Clapp
Jimmie Walker - Sgt. Val Valentine
John Vargas - Cardinal
Jourdan Fremin - Cpl. Lola Grey
Richard Jaeckel - Maj. Hawkins
Josh Mostel - Maxwell
David Naughton - Pfc. Tony Baker
George Wyner - Cpl. Wessel (aka "Weasel")
Jeffrey Bannister - Maurice

US TV Ratings

Episodes

References

External links

At Ease on film.com

1983 American television series debuts
1983 American television series endings
1980s American sitcoms
American Broadcasting Company original programming
English-language television shows
Military comedy television series
Television shows set in Texas
Television series by CBS Studios
Television series by Spelling Television